The Cathedral Basilica of St. John the Baptist is a Roman Catholic cathedral and minor basilica in Lafayette Square at 222 East Harris Street, Savannah, Georgia, in the United States. It is the mother church of the Roman Catholic Diocese of Savannah.

History
The colonial charter of Savannah prohibited Roman Catholics from settling in the city. The English trustees feared that Roman Catholics would be more loyal to the Spanish authorities in Florida than to the English government in Georgia; however, this prohibition faded shortly after the American Revolution. The church's congregation was reorganized about 1796. French Catholic émigrés established the first church after they fled Haiti in 1799, following the outbreak of slave rebellions that began on the Caribbean island in 1791. It became the main church for free blacks from Haiti in the early 19th century. Construction began on the new Cathedral of St. John the Baptist in 1859. The structure was nearly destroyed by fire in 1898 but through diligent effort was rebuilt by 1899. The Cathedral Basilica of St. John the Baptist was the first building in Georgia constructed of brick. It features 81 stained glass windows, 16 gargoyles, is 214 feet tall with a roof height of 96 feet, took over 90,000 copper nails and 45,000 slates to construct.

The congregation constructed its first church on Liberty Square in 1779 and in 1811, chose a site on Drayton and Perry Streets for a larger building. Bishop John England of the Diocese of Charleston, which encompassed Savannah, consecrated the new church April 1, 1839.  Pope Pius IX established the Diocese of Savannah in July 1850 and the congregation began to plan for a new cathedral on Lafayette Square. in 1870 under Savannah's fourth Bishop, The Right Reverend Ignatius Persico. Most Reverend James Roosevelt Bayley, Archbishop of Baltimore, presided at the dedication of the Neo-Gothic sanctuary April 30, 1876. However, the brick structure lacked spires, which were not added until 1896 when it also received a coating of stucco and whitewash.

On February 6, 1898, a fire swept the building and left only the walls and towers, however the congregation quickly rebuilt and was able to celebrate Christmas Mass in the new facility in 1899. But again, the structure was not complete and interior decoration took an additional 13 years. Stained glass windows were installed around 1904. The parish undertook subsequent renovation projects in 1959–1965, which addressed heating, cooling and lighting systems and decoration; 1984–1985, to reinforce structural foundations and implement changes suggested by the Second Vatican Council and 1998–2000 to install new roofing, and restore the original interior color palette and decorations.

Pope Francis elevated the status of the church to minor basilica in 2020.

Gallery

See also

List of Catholic cathedrals in the United States
List of cathedrals in the United States
List of Catholic basilicas
Buildings in Savannah Historic District

References

External links
 
Official Cathedral Site
Diocese of Savannah Official Site

19th-century Roman Catholic church buildings in the United States
Basilica churches in the United States
Churches in Savannah, Georgia
Churches on the National Register of Historic Places in Georgia (U.S. state)
French-American culture in Georgia (U.S. state)
Haitian-American culture in Georgia (U.S. state)
Historic district contributing properties in Georgia (U.S. state)
National Register of Historic Places in Savannah, Georgia
John the Baptist, Savannah
Roman Catholic churches completed in 1896
Roman Catholic churches in Georgia (U.S. state)
Lafayette Square (Savannah) buildings
Savannah Historic District